William Samuel Booze (January 9, 1862 – December 6, 1933) was a U.S. Representative from the third district of Maryland.

Born in Baltimore, Maryland, Booze attended the public schools in Baltimore and graduated from Baltimore City College in 1879. Afterwards attended the University of Maryland School of Medicine and graduated with a degree in medicine from the College of Physicians and Surgeons, New York City, in 1882.

Booze practiced his profession in Baltimore until 1896, when he was elected to Congress, he previously unsuccessfully contested the election of Harry Welles Rusk to the Fifty-fourth Congress, as a Republican to the Fifty-fifth Congress (March 4, 1897 - March 3, 1899). After this term, Booze  was not a candidate for renomination in 1898, he instead engaged in banking and in the brokerage business in Baltimore until 1915, when he again engaged in the practice of medicine. He was selected as a delegate to the Republican National Conventions in 1904 and 1908.

Booze died in Wilmington, Delaware, while en route to his home from a trip to South America. He is interred in Loudon Park Cemetery, Baltimore.

References

1862 births
1933 deaths
Politicians from Baltimore
Baltimore City College alumni
University of Maryland, Baltimore alumni
University of Maryland School of Medicine alumni
Columbia University Vagelos College of Physicians and Surgeons alumni
Republican Party members of the United States House of Representatives from Maryland